Han Sang-hyuk  ( born July 5, 1995), better known by his stage name Hyuk, is a South Korean singer and actor. Hyuk debuted as a member of the South Korean boy group VIXX in May 2012, and began his acting career in 2016 in the comedy-action film Chasing as Han Won-tae.

Early life
Hyuk was born and raised in Daejeon, South Korea. His family consists of himself, his parents and one older sister. He studied Practical Music at Hanlim Multi Art School and K-Pop Performance major at Dong-Ah Institute of Media and Arts.

Career

2012–2014: Debut with VIXX and variety shows

Hyuk was one of ten trainees who were contestants in Mnet's survival reality show MyDOL and was chosen to be a part of the final line-up and the 6-member boy group VIXX finally debuted with "Super Hero" on May 24, 2012, on M! Countdown.

In 2013, Hyuk appeared in episode 4 of SBS' television drama The Heirs alongside his group members.

In 2014, Hyuk appeared as a small cameo role in SBS's television drama Glorious Day alongside Leo and was a cast member in SBS's Law of the Jungle in Brazil. He was also a cast member of MBC Every 1's Hitmaker, in which he became a member and leader of Jung Hyung Don and Defconn's first project group, Big Byung, alongside VIXX member N, Got7's Jackson and BtoB's Sungjae. Going by the stage name Hyuk-di, Hyuk and the group created two singles: "Stress Come On" and "Ojingeo Doenjang".

On October 21, 2015, Hyuk's recorded solo cover of Jeff Bernat’s "Call You Mine", was uploaded exclusively to VIXX’s official YouTube channel, it was previously performed during VIXX’s LIVE FANTASIA UTOPIA concerts.

2015–present: Film debut and songwriting and composing
In 2015, it was confirmed that Hyuk will make his acting debut in the upcoming 2016 comedy-action film Chasing as Han Won-tae, alongside actors Kim Jung-tae and Kim Seung-woo with director Oh In Cheon, in the film Hyuk's character Han Won-tae is a rebellious leader of a fearless gang of high school students. The film was released in theaters in South Korea on January 7, 2016. For his work in Chasing, Hyuk won the Best Action Movie New Performer Award at the 2016 Shanghai International Film Festival.

On February 13, 2016, as a Valentine's Day gift for fans Hyuk released a cover of Justin Bieber’s “Love Yourself”, which was uploaded exclusively to VIXX's official YouTube channel. In late 2016, Hyuk contributed to the lyrics of VIXX's song "Milky Way" from their special album VIXX 2016 Conception Ker.

On January 25, 2017, Hyuk released his very first self-composed song as a gift for fans for Lunar New Year, with the title "Hug" (lit. "I'll Hold You") on his official SoundCloud and on VIXX's official YouTube Channel.

On September 4, 2017, it was confirmed that Hyuk will be starring in a law romcom drama with Apink's Chorong and his former co-actor from Chasing Kim Mingyu that will air on Naver TV and Channel A during October.

In October 2017, he has been confirmed to star in "Goodbye My Father" alongside veteran actor Park Sung Woong as Ha Neul, the filial son to his father.
Hyuk alongside the other three lead actors learned to play on saxophone for the film.

On January 8, 2019, it was confirmed that Hyuk would release his first solo single on January 12, 2019, titled "Boy with a Star". Hyuk was later cast in the Forgotten Village play as Jae-gu, a professor at a young age from Law School of Seoul National University. The show took place at Chungmu Art Hall from February 22 to April 7.

On June 1, 2022, Hyuk announced that he will be leaving Jellyfish Entertainment, while remaining a member of VIXX.

On September 29, 2022, Hyuk will release a solo single "Stay for me" (Feat. Seo In-guk), which will be released on various platforms.

Discography

Extended plays

Singles

Other recordings

Songwriting credits

Filmography

Film

Television

TV appearance & variety shows

Theater plays

Awards and nominations

References

External links

 

Jellyfish Entertainment artists
VIXX members
Japanese-language singers of South Korea
South Korean male idols
South Korean pop singers
South Korean dance music singers
South Korean male singers
South Korean male film actors
South Korean male dancers
People from Daejeon
1995 births
Living people
Hanlim Multi Art School alumni
Dong-ah Institute of Media and Arts alumni
21st-century South Korean singers